The First Academy (TFA), is a private Christian school established in 1987 in Orlando, Florida. The school serves over 1,250 students from preschool to twelfth grade.

Academics 
The First Academy is an Orlando-based private Christian school for students from preschool to 12th grade. It is an Apple Distinguished School and was named Orlando's Best Private School by Orlando Magazine in 2017, and the second-best private school by Southwest Orlando Bulletin in 2016.

Athletics
As a member of the Florida High School Athletic Association (FHSAA), The First Academy Royals participate in over 22 interscholastic sports at the varsity, junior varsity and middle school levels.

2016 Incident
In 2016, students at the school caused controversy by holding an "Instagram debate on the N-word"; some former students claimed to have experienced racism and homophobia while attending the institution. School officials denounced what had happened and implemented changes to improve race relations.

The City Beautiful Invitational 
The First Academy hosts a 16-team annual Christmas basketball tournament called the CIty Beautiful Invitational, last contested in 2019.

Notable alumni
Adam Haseley, baseball player for the Philadelphia Phillies 
Fletcher Magee, basketball player for Wofford College, All-Time leader in 3 pointers made in NCAA

References

External links

1987 establishments in Florida
Baptist schools in the United States
Christian schools in Florida
Educational institutions established in 1987
High schools in Orange County, Florida
Private elementary schools in Florida
Private high schools in Florida
Private middle schools in Florida
Schools in Orlando, Florida